Lewis Peachey (born 25 March 2001) is an English professional rugby league footballer who plays as a  forward or  for the Sheffield Eagles in the RFL Championship.

Club career

Castleford Tigers
On 22 April 2019, Peachey made his Super League début for Castleford (Heritage № 992) against the Catalans Dragons.

York City Knights (loan) 
On 14 April 2021, it was reported that Peachey had signed for the York City Knights in the RFL Championship on an initial two-week loan. He made 2 appearances for the Knights before returning to Castleford.

Newcastle Thunder (loan) 
On 14 December 2021, it was announced that Peachey had signed for the Newcastle Thunder in the RFL Championship on a season-long loan. He was available to be recalled by Castleford and was still included in their squad for the season, retaining the number 27 shirt.

References

External links
Castleford Tigers profile
SL profile

2001 births
Living people
Castleford Tigers players
Newcastle Thunder players
Rugby league players from Derbyshire
Rugby league second-rows
Sheffield Eagles players
York City Knights players